Jimmy Ng Wing-ka, JP (born 17 June 1969) is a solicitor and businessman in Hong Kong. He is the vice-president of the Chinese Manufacturers' Association of Hong Kong (CMAHK). In the 2016 Legislative Council election, Ng ran unopposed in the CMAHK's Industrial (Second) functional constituency, succeeding Lam Tai-fai in the seat.

Biography
Ng graduated with a Bachelor of Laws degree and a Postgraduate Certificate in Laws Degree from the University of Hong Kong. He is a practicing solicitor in Hong Kong and partner of George Tung, Jimmy Ng & Valent Tse, Solicitors and Tung Ng Tse & Heung Solicitors since 1997. He had served as legal adviser of Hong Kong laws of the Foreign Economics Trade Committee of the People's Government of Chongqing City.

Ng has been an Independent Non-Executive Director of Yanchang Petroleum International Limited (alternate name: Sino Union Energy Investment Group Limited) since January 2005 and an Independent Non-Executive Director of China Weaving Materials Holdings Limited since December 2011. He serves as the general committee member and vice-president of the Chinese Manufacturers' Association of Hong Kong (CMAHK) and Hong Kong Chinese Importers' and Exporters' Association and a member of the Chinese People's Political Consultative Conference of Chongqing City.

He has been member of the Election Committee, which is responsible for electing the Chief Executive since 2011 through the Industrial (Second) subsector consisting of members of the CMAHK. He has also been appointed to the Radio Television Hong Kong Board of Advisors, the Small and Medium Enterprises Committee and the Commission on Strategic Development. In 2015, he was made Justice of the Peace.

During the 2014 Hong Kong electoral reform of the electoral method for the Chief Executive, Ng represented the CMAHK to submit a report of the Constitutional and Mainland Affairs Bureau, suggesting the four-subsector structure of the nominating committee, which the first subsector represented the business interest, should be maintained. He also said that the "civil nomination" proposal as suggested by some pan-democrats was not incompatible with the Basic Law.

In the 2016 Legislative Council election, Ng ran unopposed in the CMAHK's Industrial (Second) functional constituency, succeeding Lam Tai-fai in the seat.

He joined the pro-business party Business and Professionals Alliance for Hong Kong (BPA) in December 2018.

In December 2021, it was reported that Ng had a "privileged" vote in the 2021 Hong Kong legislative election, where the vote would count approximately 7,215 times more than an ordinary citizen.

In February 2022, after the Witman Hung birthday party controversy, Ng defended Hung and said that Hung was "just unlucky".

References

1969 births
Living people
Alumni of the University of Hong Kong
Business and Professionals Alliance for Hong Kong politicians
Delegates to the 14th National People's Congress from Hong Kong
HK LegCo Members 2016–2021
HK LegCo Members 2022–2025
Hong Kong businesspeople
Members of the Election Committee of Hong Kong, 2012–2017
Solicitors of Hong Kong